I Want to Die with You or Yo quiero morir contigo is a 1941 Argentine screwball comedy film directed by Mario Soffici.

Plot
Ángel Magaña and Elisa Galvé play a constantly bickering young couple who draw up a suicide pact and prepare to kill themselves. However they are constantly interrupted by surprises, particularly the timely arrival of a dying gangster, who gives them $30,000 worth of ill goods.

Cast
Ángel Magaña
Elisa Galvé
José Olarra
Carlos Perelli
Federico Mansilla
Ilde Pirovano
Héctor Ugazzio
Vicky Astory
Julio Magaña
Gogó Andreu
Alfredo Mileo
José Ruzzo
Miguel Coiro
Adela Velich

External links
 

1941 films
1940s Spanish-language films
Argentine black-and-white films
Films directed by Mario Soffici
1940s screwball comedy films
Argentine comedy films
1941 comedy films
1940s Argentine films